Classic rock is a radio format which developed from the album-oriented rock (AOR) format in the early 1980s. In the United States, it comprises rock music ranging generally from the mid-1960s through the mid-1990s, primarily focusing on commercially successful blues rock and hard rock popularized in the 1970s AOR format. The radio format became increasingly popular with the baby boomer demographic by the end of the 1990s.

Although classic rock has mostly appealed to adult listeners, music associated with this format received more exposure with younger listeners with the presence of the Internet and digital downloading. Some classic rock stations also play a limited number of current releases which are stylistically consistent with the station's sound, or by heritage acts which are still active and producing new music.

Conceptually, classic rock has been analyzed by academics as an effort by critics, media, and music establishments to canonize rock music and commodify 1960s Western culture for audiences living in a post-baby boomer economy. The music predominantly selected for the format has been identified as commercially successful songs by white male acts from the Anglosphere, expressing values of Romanticism, self-aggrandizement, and politically undemanding ideologies. It has been associated with the album era (1960s–2000s), particularly the period's early pop/rock music.

History

The classic rock format evolved from AOR radio stations that were attempting to appeal to an older audience by including familiar songs of the past with current hits. In 1980, AOR radio station M105 in Cleveland began billing itself as "Cleveland's Classic Rock", playing a mix of rock music from the mid-1960s to the present. Similarly, WMET called itself "Chicago's Classic Rock" in 1981. In 1982, radio consultant Lee Abrams developed the "Timeless Rock" format which combined contemporary AOR with rock hits from the 1960s and 1970s.

KRBE, an AM station in Houston, was an early classic rock radio station. In 1983 program director Paul Christy designed a format which played only early album rock, from the 1960s and early 1970s, without current music or any titles from the pop or dance side of Top 40. Another AM station airing classic rock, beginning in 1983, was KRQX in Dallas-Fort Worth.  KRQX was co-owned with an album rock station, 97.9 KZEW.  Management saw the benefit in the FM station appealing to younger rock fans and the AM station appealing a bit older.  The ratings of both stations could be added together to appeal to advertisers. Classic rock soon became the widely used descriptor for the format and became the commonly used term among the general public for early album rock music.

In the mid-1980s, the format's widespread proliferation came on the heels of Jacobs Media's (Fred Jacobs) success at WCXR, in Washington, D.C., and Edinborough Rand's (Gary Guthrie) success at WZLX in Boston. Between Guthrie and Jacobs, they converted more than 40 major market radio stations to their individual brand of classic rock over the next several years.

Billboard magazine's Kim Freeman posits that "while classic rock's origins can be traced back earlier, 1986 is generally cited as the year of its birth".  By 1986, the success of the format resulted in oldies accounting for 60–80% of the music played on album rock stations. Although it began as a niche format spun off from AOR, by 2001 classic rock had surpassed album rock in market share nationally.

During the mid-1980s, the classic rock format was mainly tailored to the adult male demographic ages 25–34, which remained its largest demographic through the mid-1990s. As the format's audience aged, its demographics skewed toward older age groups. By 2006, the 35–44 age group was the format's largest audience and by 2014 the 45–54 year-old demographic was the largest.

Programming
Typically, classic rock stations play rock songs from the mid-1960s through the 1980s and began adding 1990s music in the early 2010s. Most recently there has been a "newer classic rock" under the slogan of the next generation of classic rock.  Stations such as WLLZ in Detroit, WBOS in Boston, and WKQQ in Lexington  play music focusing more on harder edge classic rock from the 1980s to the 2000s. There has been a recent revival in the older fashions of classic rock in the early 2000s. Back in the prime of classic rock radio during the 1970s and 1980s, when it was mainstream, and radio was the main form of accessing the music, classic rock soared in to every individual's ear. Classic rock will not overtake the current style of hip-hop/pop, but teenagers specifically are set to introduce the contents of classic rock into their rotation of music. The peak of classic rock in the 1980s had its downfall in the 1990s and has risen back to streaming platforms and internet sources.

Some of the artists that are featured heavily on classic rock radio are The Beatles, Pink Floyd, Aerosmith, AC/DC, Quiet Riot, Bruce Springsteen, John Mellencamp, Def Leppard, Mötley Crüe, Boston, The Cars, Fleetwood Mac, Billy Joel, Elton John, Eric Clapton, The Who, Van Halen, Rush, Black Sabbath, Metallica, U2, Guns N’ Roses, Beastie Boys, Lynyrd Skynyrd, The Eagles, the Doors, Styx, Queen, Led Zeppelin, and Jimi Hendrix. The songs of the Rolling Stones, particularly from the 1970s, have become staples of classic rock radio. "(I Can't Get No) Satisfaction" (1965), "Under My Thumb" (1966), "Paint It, Black" (1966), and "Miss You" (1978) are among their most popular selections, with Complex calling the latter "an eternal mainstay on classic-rock radio".

A 2006 Rolling Stone article noted that teens were surprisingly interested in classic rock and speculated that the interest in the older bands might be related to the absence of any new, dominant sounds in rock music since the advent of grunge.

Analysis and criticism 

Classic-rock radio programmers largely play "tried and proven" hit songs from the past based on their "high listener recognition and identification", says media academic Roy Shuker, who also identifies white male rock acts from the Beatles' Sgt. Pepper-era through the end of the 1970s as the focus of their playlists. As Catherine Strong observes, classic rock songs are generally performed by white male acts from either the United States or the United Kingdom, "have a four-four time, very rarely exceed the time limit of four minutes, were composed by the musicians themselves, are sung in English, played by a 'classical' rock formation (drums, bass, guitar, keyboard instruments) and were released on a major label after 1964." Classic rock has also been associated with the album era (1960s–2000s), by writers Bob Lefsetz and Matthew Restall, who says the term is a relabeling of the "virtuoso pop/rock" from the era's early decades.

The format's origins are traced by music scholar Jon Stratton to the emergence of a classic-rock canon. This canon arose in part from music journalism and superlative lists ranking certain albums and songs that are consequently reinforced to the collective and public memory. Robert Christgau says the classic-rock concept transmogrified rock music into a "myth of rock as art-that-stands-the-test-of-time". He also believes it was inevitable that certain rock artists would be canonized by critics, major media, and music establishment entities such as the Rock and Roll Hall of Fame. In 2018 Steven Hyden recalls how the appearance of classic rock as a timeless music lent it a distinction from the "inherently nihilistic" pop he had first listened to on the radio as a teenager in the early 1990s. "[I]t seemed to have been around forever," he writes of the classic rock format. "It was there long before I was born, and I was sure it was still going to be around after I was gone."

Politically, the mindset underlying classic rock is regarded by Christgau as regressive. He says the music in this format abandoned ironic sensibilities in favor of unintellectual, conventional aesthetics rooted in Victorian era Romanticism, while downplaying the more radical aspects of 1960s counterculture, such as politics, race, African-American music, and pop in the art sense. "Though classic rock draws its inspiration and most of its heroes from the '60s, it is, of course, a construction of the '70s," he writes in 1991 for Details magazine. "It was invented by prepunk/predisco radio programmers who knew that before they could totally commodify '60s culture they'd have to rework it—that is, selectively distort it till it threatened no one ... In the official rock pantheon the Doors and Led Zeppelin are Great Artists while Chuck Berry and Little Richard are Primitive Forefathers and James Brown and Sly Stone are Something Else."

Regarding the relationship of economics to the rise of classic rock, Christgau believes there was compromised socioeconomic security and diminishing collective consciousness of a new generation of listeners in the 1970s, who succeeded rock's early years during baby-boomer economic prosperity in the United States: "Not for nothing did classic rock crown the Doors' mystagogic middlebrow escapism and Led Zep's chest-thumping megalomaniac grandeur. Rhetorical self-aggrandizement that made no demands on everyday life was exactly what the times called for." Shuker attributes the rise of classic-rock radio in part to "the consumer power of the aging post-war 'baby boomers' and the appeal of this group to radio advertisers". In his opinion, classic rock also produced a rock music ideology and discussion of the music that was "heavily gendered", celebrating "a male homosocial paradigm of musicianship" that "continued to dominate subsequent discourse, not just around rock music, but of popular music more generally."

See also

 Active rock
 Classic alternative
 Christgau's Record Guide: Rock Albums of the Seventies
 Mainstream rock
 Music radio
 Rockism and poptimism

References

1950s in music
1960s in music
1970s in music
1980s in music
1990s in music
2000s in music
2010s in music
Radio formats
Rock radio formats